Raiola is an Italian surname and it may refer to:
Angela Raiola (1960-2016), American reality television personality
Dominic Raiola, (born 1978), American football center, brother of Donovan
Donovan Raiola, (born 1982), American football center, brother of Dominic
Joe Raiola (born 1955), comedian
Mino Raiola (1967–2022), football agent

Italian-language surnames